The Women's triple at the 2014 Commonwealth Games, was part of the lawn bowls competition, which took place between 28 and 31 July 2014 at the Kelvingrove Lawn Bowls Centre.

Sectional play

Section A

Section B

Section C

Section D

Knockout stage

Quarterfinals

Semifinals

Finals

Gold medal match

Bronze medal match

References

Lawn bowls at the 2014 Commonwealth Games
Comm